Igor Kaleshin may refer to:

 Igor Kaleshin (footballer, born 1952), Soviet football player and Russian coach
 Igor Kaleshin (footballer, born 1983), Russian football player